Harold Hawkins (22 July 1886 – 16 June 1917) was a British sports shooter. He competed in four events at the 1908 Summer Olympics winning a silver medal in the disappearing target event. He was killed in action during World War I.

See also
 List of Olympians killed in World War I

References

1886 births
1917 deaths
British male sport shooters
Olympic shooters of Great Britain
Shooters at the 1908 Summer Olympics
Olympic silver medallists for Great Britain
Olympic medalists in shooting
Medalists at the 1908 Summer Olympics
People from Finchley
Sportspeople from London
British military personnel killed in World War I